WikiIslam is an anti-Muslim and anti-Islam wiki. The website was founded by Ali Sina in 2006 and acquired by the Ex-Muslims of North America in 2015. Registered users may modify and edit its content.

Overview
The website was registered on October 27, 2005 and launched on September 4, 2006. It was founded by Ali Sina, an Iranian-born Canadian ex-Muslim, and originally maintained by his organization, Faith Freedom International, part of the counter-jihad network.  As of 2013, among the site's aim was to act in defence against a perceived "global threat" of Muslims and Islam; the site described its purpose as "collect[ing] facts relating to the criticism of Islam from valid Islamic sources" without the effect of "[politically correct] censorship" that is common in Wikipedia. It rejected concerns of Islamophobia by arguing that Islam has been proved to be a "dangerous ideology". 

As a "community-edited website", the wiki was set to be edited and modified by (registered) approved netizens. , information on (alleged) internal contradictions in the Quran, persecution of non-Muslims and ex-Muslims, follies of Muhammad etc. are held; a narrow focus is maintained on "violence, sexuality and gender conflicts". Also as of 2018, apostasy testimonies are featured too and the site holds a list of 101 provocative questions which are to be asked of any Muslim to prove that Islam is not a "true religion," running in tune with the site's active encouragement to criticize Muslims. Translations of content into multiple languages are available. In December 2015, the Ex-Muslims of North America (EXMNA), a secularist organization, took ownership and operation of the site.

Reception 
In 2007, Göran Larsson, Professor of Religious Studies at University of Gothenburg, argued that WikiIslam is an Islamophobic web portal and that the stories on WikiIslam were selected only to show that Muslims are "ignorant, backward or even stupid".  In a 2014 survey of "anti-Muslim websites", Larsson profiled WikiIslam's apparent aim as "present[ing] Islamic history, theology and practitioners in a way which leaves the reader with an exceedingly negative image of the faith". He repeated his position in 2018, citing WikiIslam as an example of an "anti-Muslim webpage."

In 2013, Daniel Enstedt and Larsson wrote that the website has been "often perceived as being anti-Muslim, if not Islamophobic," describing the then-present content on WikiIslam as part of a "negative and biased" representation of Islam that could "easily be turned into an important weapon in the hands of those who want to express anti-Muslim feelings"; the site propagated "an Islamophobic world view that present[ed] Islam and Muslims as diametrically opposite to all others." Both Enstedt and Larrson have contended WikiIslam's selection and presentation of Islamic topics to be "very one-dimensional" with "alternative interpretations [by Muslim theologians] seldom represented". The same year, WikiIslam was noted to feature slurs about Muhammad.

In 2019, Asma Uddin, advisor on religious liberty to OSCE and a fellow at the Aspen Institute, reiterated WikiIslam to be a "rampantly anti-Muslim website". The same year, Syaza Shukri, Professor of Political Sciences at International Islamic University Malaysia, deemed the lack of positive content on WikiIslam to demonstrate a  "definite agenda": the promotion of a monolithic version of Islam—violent, oppressive, and unrepresentative of "how a majority of Muslims view their religion". Rabia Kamal, a cultural anthropologist based at University of San Francisco, finds WikiIslam to be of the many Islamophobic websites dedicated to "surveillance" of Islam and Muslims.

Notes

References

External links 

Counter-jihad
Internet properties established in 2006
Islamophobic publications
Wiki communities